Armando Osma Rueda (born 7 December 1961) is a Colombian football manager and former player who played as a forward.

Playing career
Born in Bucaramanga, Osma began his career with hometown side Atlético Bucaramanga in 1981. He subsequently represented Once Caldas, Deportivo Cali, Deportes Tolima, Millonarios and Cortuluá before returning to his first club in 1996. He retired in 1997, aged 36.

Managerial career
After retiring, Osma began his managerial career with Deportivo Cali's youth categories in 1999. In 2002, he joined Luis Fernando Suárez's staff at Deportes Tolima, and subsequently followed Suárez to Aucas and the Ecuador national team.

In 2007, Osma was also manager of the Ecuador under-23 national team. In the December of that year, he took over Olmedo, but reunited with Suárez in 2009, at Peruvian side Juan Aurich.

In 2011, Osma was named manager of Manta. He took over Macará in April 2013, before returning to Manta in August the following year.

In 2015, Osma was appointed manager of El Nacional's youth categories. In August the following year, he was named at the helm of Aucas, and later rejoined Suárez's staff at La Equidad.

After working with Suárez at Junior, Osma returned to managerial duties in February 2021, with Honduran side Águila. He later returned to Ecuador to take over América de Quito in June of that year, before rejoining his first club Bucaramanga on 24 February 2022, in the place of resigned Néstor Craviotto. He was sacked from Atlético Bucaramanga on 10 October.

References

External links

1960 births
Living people
People from Bucaramanga
Colombian footballers
Atlético Bucaramanga footballers
Once Caldas footballers
Deportivo Cali footballers
Deportes Tolima footballers
Millonarios F.C. players
Cortuluá footballers
Colombian football managers
C.D. Olmedo managers
Manta F.C. managers
C.S.D. Macará managers
C.D. El Nacional managers
S.D. Aucas managers
C.D. Águila managers
Atlético Bucaramanga managers
Colombian expatriate football managers
Colombian expatriate sportspeople in Ecuador
Colombian expatriate sportspeople in Peru
Colombian expatriate sportspeople in Honduras
Expatriate football managers in Ecuador
Expatriate football managers in Honduras
Sportspeople from Santander Department